Barry is a city in Big Stone County, Minnesota, United States. The population was 16 at the 2020 census.

Minnesota State Highway 28 serves as a main route in the community.

History
Barry was named for the Barry brothers, early settlers.

Geography

Demographics

2010 census
As of the census of 2010, there were 16 people, 6 households, and 6 families living in the city. The racial makeup of the city was 100.0% White.

There were 6 households, of which 33.3% had children under the age of 18 living with them, 83.3% were married couples living together, and 16.7% had a male householder with no wife present. 0.0% of all households were made up of individuals. The average household size was 2.67 and the average family size was 2.50.

The median age in the city was 50.5 years. 12.5% of residents were under the age of 18; 12.6% were between the ages of 18 and 24; 18.9% were from 25 to 44; 37.5% were from 45 to 64; and 18.8% were 65 years of age or older. The gender makeup of the city was 50.1% male and 49.9% female.

2000 census
As of the census of 2000, there were 25 people, 12 households, and 6 families living in the city. The racial makeup of the city was 100.00% White.

There were 12 households, out of which 16.7% had children under the age of 18 living with them, 50.0% were married couples living together, and 41.7% were non-families. 41.7% of all households were made up of individuals, and none had someone living alone who was 65 years of age or older. The average household size was 2.08 and the average family size was 2.86.

In the city, the population was spread out, with 20.0% under the age of 18, 16.0% from 18 to 24, 4.0% from 25 to 44, 48.0% from 45 to 64, and 12.0% who were 65 years of age or older. The median age was 51 years. For every 100 females, there were 127.3 males. For every 100 females age 18 and over, there were 100.0 males.

The median income for a household in the city was $18,250, and the median income for a family was $19,250. Males had a median income of $0 versus $0 for females. The per capita income for the city was $7,124. There were no families and 19.0% of the population living below the poverty line, including no under eighteens and none of those over 64.

References

Cities in Big Stone County, Minnesota
Cities in Minnesota